Robert Sparr (September 10, 1915 – August 28, 1969) was an American screenwriter, television director, and film director. He died as a result of a plane crash in Colorado while scouting filming locations for the 1970 film Barquero with fellow Star Trek crew member, cameraman Gerald Finnerman. The pilot was also killed but Finnerman survived. The plane crash prompted a drawn-out legal battle involving Sparr's son for a wrongful death suit, which went to the United States Court of Appeals, Tenth Circuit.

Selected filmography as a director

 Once You Kiss a Stranger (1969)
 The Outcasts (1969)
 More Dead Than Alive (1968)
 Lassie (1967–1968)
 Voyage to the Bottom of the Sea (1967–1968)
 The Rat Patrol (1967)
 The High Chaparral (1967)
 Batman (1967)
 The Wild Wild West (1966–1967)
 Star Trek (1966)
 Perry Mason
 A Swingin' Summer (1965)
 77 Sunset Strip (1961–1963)
 The Gallant Men (1963)
 Cheyenne (1960–1962)
 Surfside 6 (1962)
 Bronco (1960–1962)
 Bonanza (1961)
 The Roaring 20's (1961)
 Hawaiian Eye (1961)
 Lawman (1959–1960)
 The Alaskans (1959)

References

External links

1915 births
1969 deaths
Accidental deaths in Colorado
American film directors
American film editors
American television directors
Victims of aviation accidents or incidents in 1969
Victims of aviation accidents or incidents in the United States